The canton of Haute-Dordogne is an administrative division of the Corrèze department, south-central France. It was created at the French canton reorganisation which came into effect in March 2015. Its seat is in Bort-les-Orgues.

It consists of the following communes:
 
Bort-les-Orgues
Chirac-Bellevue
Confolent-Port-Dieu
Lamazière-Basse
Latronche
Liginiac
Margerides
Mestes
Monestier-Port-Dieu
Neuvic
Palisse
Roche-le-Peyroux
Saint-Bonnet-près-Bort
Sainte-Marie-Lapanouze
Saint-Étienne-aux-Clos
Saint-Étienne-la-Geneste
Saint-Exupéry-les-Roches
Saint-Fréjoux
Saint-Hilaire-Luc
Saint-Pantaléon-de-Lapleau
Saint-Victour
Sarroux-Saint Julien
Sérandon
Thalamy
Valiergues
Veyrières

References

Cantons of Corrèze